Empresa Ecuatoriana de Aviación, more commonly known as simply Ecuatoriana, was the national airline of Ecuador. The carrier had an operational hiatus between September 1993 and August 1995, resuming operations on 23 June 1996, after VASP became the controlling shareholder. The airline folded permanently in 2006.

History

Compañía Ecuatoriana de Aviación

Compañia Ecuatoriana de Aviación (CEA) was established in May 1957, after a group of American and Ecuadorian investors decided to set up an airline. At first, 50 percent of the airline was owned by Americans. Operations started in August 1957. Serving a relatively small country, the airline had a varied fleet that consisted of Curtiss C-46, Douglas DC-4, Douglas DC-6 and one Junkers K 16 aircraft. The Junkers airplane was a rarity, as Junkers airliners were already considered to be classics at the time.

Ecuatoriana began serving both domestic and international destinations immediately after it started flying. International routes proved to be rather long trips: there were jets already in operation when Ecuatoriana began flying (before the Boeing 707 made its first flight), but they were predominantly used by European airlines. Ecuatoriana's equipment necessitated a stopover in Panama City for its first international route, from Quito to Miami. Likewise, routes from Quito and Guayaquil to Santiago de Chile included stopovers in Lima, Peru.

The airline's livery featured a tailfin logo of alternating blue and white diagonal stripes. The airline operated Lockheed L-188 Electra four-engined turboprop airliners on longer distance scheduled passenger services, including the key Quito-Bogota-Miami route, between March 1967 and March 1975.

Empresa Ecuatoriana de Aviación

American investors pulled out of the company during the early 1970s, prompting the creation of a new company. Empresa Ecuatoriana de Aviación, a state-owned company, took over the routes, liabilities, and assets of CEA. It was established in July 1974, becoming the flag carrier of Ecuador. By this time, the airline had modernized its fleet to include the Boeing 707, and a new, colorful "rainbow" livery attracted airplane spotters at new destinations such as New York's John F. Kennedy International Airport and Buenos Aires' Ezeiza International Airport. Some of Ecuatoriana's aircraft became flying canvases for abstract artwork. These distinctively-painted aircraft were seen as a response to Braniff's Alexander Calder-painted aircraft. During the late 1970s and early 1980s, Braniff was Ecuatoriana's main competitor on many routes, including Miami-Quito/Guayaquil.

In the 1970s, most South American national airlines were operated by national air forces. Through the Defence Ministry, the Ecuadorian Air Force bought two refurbished Boeing 707s for the airline from Israeli Aircraft Industries in a deal worth  million. Ecuatoriana also acquired a Douglas DC-10 from Swissair and opened non-stop routes to Canada. Having jet equipment meant that long flights with stopovers were no longer necessary, and non-stop routes were opened all over South America and to other North American cities.

Ecuatoriana also opened flights to destinations such as Mexico City and Madrid, Spain. The Quito and Guayaquil to Madrid routes in particular proved extremely competitive, as Iberia was popular among travelers who flew those two routes.

During the 1980s, Ecuatoriana de Aviación began conducting business with the European Airbus consortium, buying Airbus A310 jetliners. Ecuatoriana debuted a pair of Airbus A-310s in the early 1990s.

Collapse
Rumors that government officials flew their family members for free on Ecuatoriana hurt the airline's reputation. During the late 1980s, Ecuatoriana had also developed a reputation for being unreliable. Lengthy flight delays and cancellations were commonplace. Faced with these problems, as well as competition from other carriers such as the privately owned Ecuadorian carrier SAETA, American Airlines (which had assumed Eastern Air Lines' Latin America routes in 1990), and Continental Airlines, which began serving Ecuador from its Houston hub in 1991, Ecuatoriana ceased operations.

Affected by the general economic crisis in South America during the 1990s, Ecuatoriana encountered deep financial problems. The airline stopped flying at the end of September 1993. Some of its leased airplanes, two A310s leased directly from Airbus and its single DC-10, were taken back with the latter stranded in Panama since Ecuatoriana was not able to meet the lease payments. Ecuatoriana was forced to rely on competitors TAME and SAETA to fly its North and South American routes, after a deal with Costa Rican LACSA broke down. At the end of 1994, SAETA made a $31 million bid in an attempt to acquire Ecuatoriana, but this didn't go through.

After a lengthy privatization process, with the participation of nine consortiums that included ACES, Air France, British Aerospace, Carnival Airlines, Challenge Air Cargo, Continental Airlines, Aerogal and TACA, the consortium led by Brazilian airline VASP (and local investor Juan Eljuri) won the bid through the Guayaquil and Quito stock exchanges, buying 50.1 percent in August 1995 (at $1500 per stock), with a five-year business plan and an effective injection of $10 million during the stock bidding. The government retained the remaining 49.9% and announced it would keep 25% of the remaining stocks (administered by TAME), with 24.9% to be sold within six months. The process was not exempt from political controversy, as the Comptroller, the Supreme Court and the Congress all questioned the process.

With privatization complete, Ecuatoriana received some Boeing 727s, which were repainted in Miami and at Tucson International Airport in Tucson, Arizona. By 1996, short domestic and international services were restarted, with a livery that resembled VASP's. A single DC-10, also borrowed from VASP, allowed the airline to reintroduce services to Madrid's Barajas International Airport.

 saw the airline flying to Buenos Aires, Cancún, Guayaquil, Manaus, Mexico City, Panama City and Santiago using  Airbus A310-300,  Boeing 727-200 Advanced and  McDonnell Douglas DC-10-30. That year, Ecuatoriana was caught up in an overall collapse of Ecuador's economy and once again found itself in financial trouble, and VASP decided to sell its part of the airline, with both Aero Continente and Lan Chile being bidders at that time. Despite claims that Lan Chile was not interested in Ecuatoriana, the Chilean carrier was operating its own aircraft on behalf of Ecuatoriana on the lucrative routes to the US after Ecuatoriana's aircraft were repossessed by lessors in late 2000. Following the rejection of Aero Continente's bid and the suspension of Ecuatoriana's air operator certificate, Ecuador's civil aviation authority cleared Lan Chile to start up a subsidiary named Lan Ecuador to fly many international routes previously operated by Ecuatoriana.

Lan Chile owned 50 percent of the airline, wet-leasing two Boeing 767s to the company, but in 2004 sold its part to Lloyd Aéreo Boliviano. By early 2005 LAN had taken over Ecuatoriana's routes and fleet.

Destinations

Ecuatoriana served the following destinations throughout its history:

Historical fleet

The airline operated the following equipment at various times during its history:

Airbus A310-300
Boeing 720B
Boeing 727-200
Boeing 707-320B
Boeing 707-320C
Douglas DC-4
Douglas DC-6
Lockheed L-188 Electra
McDonnell Douglas DC-10-30

Accidents and incidents
On 14 March 1972, Douglas C-47 HC-SJE was reported to have been damaged beyond economic repair in an accident at Sangay.

References

Bibliography
Sherlock, Jay L., Lockheed L-188 Electra and Orion, Air-Britain (Historians) Ltd, 1977,

External links

Defunct airlines of Ecuador
Military airlines
Airlines established in 1957
Airlines disestablished in 2006
1957 establishments in Ecuador
2006 disestablishments in Ecuador